Astrophysikalisches Institut und Universitäts-Sternwarte Jena (AIU Jena, Astrophysical Institute and University Observatory Jena, or simply Jena Observatory) is an astronomical observatory owned and operated by Friedrich Schiller University of Jena. It is located in Großschwabhausen close to Jena, Germany.

WASP-3c & TTV 
Transit Timing Variation (TTV), a variation on the transit method, was used to discover an exoplanet WASP-3c by Rozhen Observatory, Jena Observatory, and Toruń Centre for Astronomy.

See also 
 List of astronomical observatories

References

External links 
 Jena Observatory
 Universitäts-Sternwarte Jena

Astronomical observatories in Germany
Buildings and structures in Jena
Glass engineering and science